Kharturan Rural District is a rural district (dehestan) in Beyarjomand District, Shahrud County, Semnan Province, Iran. At the 2006 census, its population was 3,616, in 985 families.  The rural district has 34 villages.

See also 
 Khar Turan National Park

References 

Rural Districts of Semnan Province
Shahrud County